Penajam is a town and the administrative capital of Penajam North Paser Regency, in East Kalimantan Province, Indonesia.

Climate
Penajam has a tropical rainforest climate (Af) with heavy rainfall year-round.

References

penajam North Paser Regency
Districts of East Kalimantan
Regency seats of East Kalimantan